Ismael Austria Mathay Jr. (June 26, 1932 – December 25, 2013), also known as Mel Mathay, was the Mayor of Quezon City from 1992 to 2001.

Early life and education
Ismael Austria Mathay, Jr. was born in Manila on June 26, 1932. He was the son of Ismael Mathay Sr., an Osmeña Cabinet member. 

Mathay graduated in 1953 with bachelor's degree in Business Administration Major in Economics in the University of the Philippines, where he joined the prestigious Upsilon Sigma Phi. Soon after graduation he enrolled at the College of Law in San Beda and successfully passed the bar examination in 1957.

Political career
Mathay was elected Vice Mayor of Quezon City in 1967, serving from 1968 to 1971. In 1972, he was appointed secretary to the commissioner of the watchdog General Authority Office, a genuine recognition for his talent and integrity. Mathay had completed tenure of 9 years. 

Prior to his becoming city mayor, he served as the vice-governor of the Metro Manila Commission from 1979 to 1986, an assemblyman representing Quezon City in the Regular Batasang Pambansa from 1984 to 1986, congressman representing Quezon City's 4th district from 1987 to 1992. He was director of the Metropolitan Waterworks and Sewerage System from 1979 to 1987, and chairman of the Metro Manila Authority from 1993 to 1994. He tried to reclaim the mayoral position in 2004 and 2010 but lost to Feliciano Belmonte Jr. and Herbert Bautista, respectively.

Personal life
Mathay married his long-time partner Vilma Valera early in 2013 after the death of his wife Sonya Gandionco.

Death
Mathay died of a heart attack at the age of 81 on December 25, 2013, at The Medical City Ortigas, Pasig.

References

 

1932 births
2013 deaths
Chairpersons of the Metropolitan Manila Development Authority
Laban ng Demokratikong Pilipino politicians
Mayors of Quezon City
Members of the House of Representatives of the Philippines from Quezon City
People from Quezon City
Kilusang Bagong Lipunan politicians
Independent politicians in the Philippines
Nacionalista Party politicians
Ramos administration personnel
San Beda University alumni
Members of the Batasang Pambansa